The 2019 FIVB Men's World Cup was the 14th edition of the event, contested by the senior men's national teams of the members of the  (FIVB), the sport's global governing body. The tournament was held from 1 to 15 October 2019 in Japan. That was the first time since 1989 that FIVB decided not to allocate any spots in the Olympics, due to Japan hosting the 2020 Summer Olympics.

Qualification
Twelve teams qualified for the competition by being one of the top two teams of each continental federation based on FIVB World Ranking on 1 January 2019 (except Japan who qualified as hosts, and Poland who qualified as 2018 World Champions).

Qualified teams

Notes
1 Competed as Soviet Union; 5th appearance as Russia.

Squads

Venues

Format

The competition system of the 2019 World Cup was the single Round-Robin system. Each team played once against each of the other 11 teams.

The teams were divided into 2 pools of 6 teams each. In round 1, total 30 matches in 5 days, each teams played against the other teams from the same pool. For rounds 2 and 3, total 36 matches in 6 days, each team played against the teams from another pool. Numbers in brackets denoted the FIVB World Ranking as of 1 January 2019 except the hosts who ranked 11th.

 Match points
 Number of matches won
 Sets ratio
 Points ratio
 Result of the last match between the tied teams

Match won 3–0 or 3–1: 3 match points for the winner, 0 match points for the loser 
Match won 3–2: 2 match points for the winner, 1 match point for the loser

Results

|}

First round

Site A
|}

Site B
|}

Second round

Site A
|}

Site B
|}

Third round

Site A
|}

Site B
|}

Final standing

Awards

 Most Valuable Player
  Alan Souza
 Best Setter
  Micah Christenson
 Best Outside Spikers
  Wilfredo León
  Yūki Ishikawa

 Best Middle Blockers
  Maxwell Holt
  Lucas Saatkamp
 Best Opposite Spiker
  Yūji Nishida
 Best Libero
  Thales Hoss

Statistics leaders
The statistics of each group follows the vis reports P2 and P3. The statistics include 6 volleyball skills; serve, reception, set, spike, block, and dig. The table below shows the top 5 ranked players in each skill plus top scorers .

References

External links
 Official website

2019 Men
FIVB World Cup Men
FIVB Volleyball Men's World Cup
International volleyball competitions hosted by Japan
FIVB Volleyball Men's World Cup
Volleyball in Japan